The 1918 Camp Lewis football team represented the United States Army's 13th Division stationed Camp Lewis in Tacoma, Washington, during the 1918 college football season. The team compiled a 7–2 record.

The 1917 Camp Lewis football team was made up from members of the Army's 91st Division. However, the 91st Division was deployed to France, and the 1918 team was made up of entirely different personnel from the 13th Division.

Ray Selph of the 1918 Camp Lewis team was selected by Walter Camp as the second-team center on the 1918 All-Service football team.

Schedule

References

Camp Lewis
Camp Lewis football